Axel Wachtmeister (13 January 1643 – 24 July 1699) was a Swedish count and field marshal.

Axel Wachtmeister was the younger son of Hans Wachtmeister and Agnes Margareta von Helmstedt. His elder brother was Swedish admiral (and their father's namesake) Hans Wachtmeister. His father was a member of an Estonian-Finnish-German family of incorporated Swedish nobles, and was elevated to the title of Baron of Koivisto, near Viipuri, eastern Finland, in 1653.

Axel Wachtmeister distinguished himself in the Scanian War (1675–1679), became a colonel in 1676 and was appointed Major General in 1679. In 1697, he was appointed chairman in Krigskollegium, the headquarters of the Swedish Army. From 1680 and onwards, he had the title Royal Counsellor and was a close associate of King Charles XI. Baron Axel Wachtmeister became count of Mälsåker and field marshal in 1693.

He married Baroness Anna Maria Soop (1660-1735), who married into the Gyllenstierna family after his death.

References
The article Wachtmeister, Axel in Nationalencyklopedin (1996).
Axel Wachtmeister, Historiesajten 
Svea-Rikes Rods-Längd by Carl H. Uggla 
http://runeberg.org/anrep/4/0532.html

17th-century Swedish nobility
Field marshals of Sweden
1643 births
1699 deaths
17th-century Swedish military personnel